The Association of Welsh Translators and Interpreters, which brands itself with its Welsh name Cymdeithas Cyfieithwyr Cymru, is a professional body representing English/Welsh translators and interpreters in Wales. The association has some 340 members, most of whom are translators; less than a quarter are interpreters. The Association of Welsh Translators and Interpreters is a member of the International Federation of Translators (FIT).

History 
The Association of Welsh Translators and Interpreters was established in 1976 to provide a forum for the discussion of issues relating to Welsh/English translation and interpreting. Its goal is to ensure professional translation standards are upheld in the field of Welsh/English translation and interpreting. The association also advises the Welsh Language Commissioner on translation issues.

See also 
 Wales Interpretation and Translation Service

References

External links 
 Association of Welsh Translators and Interpreters website

Translation associations of the United Kingdom
Welsh language
1976 establishments in Wales
Organizations established in 1976